Thomas Hussey (died 1468), of Shapwick, Dorset, was an English politician.

He was a Member (MP) of the Parliament of England for Great Bedwyn in 1421, for Old Sarum in 1423, for Melcombe Regis in 1427 and for Dorset in 1435.

References

Year of birth missing
1468 deaths
English MPs May 1421
Politicians from Dorset
Members of Parliament for Great Bedwyn
English MPs 1423
English MPs 1427
English MPs 1435
Members of the Parliament of England (pre-1707) for Old Sarum